Shamsuddin bin Dali (Jawi: شمسو الدين بن دالي) or better known as S. Shamsuddin (1 January 1929 – 4 June 2013) was a Singaporean actor and comedian who appeared in Malayan films during the 1950s and 1960s.

Early life 
S. Shamsuddin or Pak Sudin as he is affectionately known, was born in Pasir Panjang, Singapore. His father, Dali bin Kechik was from Malacca, Malaysia, while his mother, Khatijah binti Haji Ahmad was from Geylang, Singapore. He previously worked as a labourer to help his family before he entered the acting profession.

Career 

One day, in 1948, he went to the Studio Malay Film Productions (MFP) at Jalan Ampas just to see how filming works. His visit turned out to be a lucky one for him as he was given an opportunity to work as an extra in a film titled Chempaka directed by B. S. Rajhans. A few days later he sought work at the MFP, getting a job as a carpenter for studios and filming sets. Meanwhile, he also worked as an extra or dancer in films.

Eventually, he was given a role in a film titled Aloha, also directed by Rajhans. He acted in a few scenes that required a lot of dialogue, which is considered plenty for an extra or even new actor. His comedic role in the film acted alongside Osman Gumanti, Mariam, P. Ramlee, A. R. Tompel and D. Harris, showed his talents in acting. More film offers continued, and Sudin eventually became a comedian staple of the Malay films of that era alongside Aziz Sattar, both appearing with successful actor P. Ramlee on numerous occasions, most notably in the Bujang Lapok series of films.

Personal life 
S. Shamsuddin married Puteh binti Esmoon in 1954, from which they had 7 children and 14 grandchildren. One of his children, Ariff Shamsuddin is also a comedian and TV actor who had recently participated in a Malaysian reality show titled Maharaja Lawak Mega.

Death 
Following several years of poor health, S. Shamsuddin died at 10:56 in the morning of 4 June 2013 at the age of 84 at his residence in West Avenue 6, Bukit Batok and his remains was laid to rest at the Pusara Abadi Muslim Cemetery at Lim Chu Kang on 5 June 2013 at 11:00 am.

Filmography

Film

Television movie

Awards and nominations

References

External links
 

1929 births
2013 deaths
Singaporean male actors
20th-century Singaporean male actors
Singaporean people of Malay descent
Singaporean Muslims
Malay Film Productions contract players
Pesona Pictures contract players